Ali Rogers Fauntleroy (born October 29, 1991) is an American beauty pageant titleholder from Laurens, South Carolina who was named Miss South Carolina 2012.

Biography
She won the title of Miss South Carolina on July 14, 2012, when she received her crown from outgoing titleholder Bree Boyce. Rogers was swimsuit preliminary winner at Miss South Carolina 2012. Rogers' platform is “Making a Difference for Children with Disabilities” and she said she hoped to raise awareness for children with developmental disabilities during her reign as Miss South Carolina. Her competition talent was an original piano composition. Rogers majored in Communication Studies and is a member of Alpha Delta Pi at Clemson University. At the age of 17, Rogers won the title of Miss South Carolina Teen in 2009, and went on to compete in the Miss America's Outstanding Teen pageant in 2010.

References

External links
 

Miss America 2013 delegates
Living people
1991 births
Clemson University alumni
American beauty pageant winners
People from Laurens, South Carolina
Miss America Preliminary Swimsuit winners